Estevão Alvarenga Toniato (born 6 April 1979 in Brazil) is a Brazilian retired footballer who last played for Real Noroeste Capixaba Futebol Clube in his home country.

Career
Toniato started his senior career with Clube Atlético Mineiro. After that, he played for Uberlândia Esporte Clube, Social Futebol Clube, S.L. Benfica, Associação Desportiva Ferroviária Vale do Rio Doce, Entrerriense Futebol Clube, Rio Branco Atlético Clube, Sport Club do Recife, Império Toledo de Futebol, Estrela do Norte Futebol Clube, and Stade Tunisien. In 2009, he signed for Beijing Renhe in the Chinese Super League, where he made twenty-six league appearances and scored zero goals.

References

External links 
 Estevão: A tour of Tunisia
 From the Rooster to the Maghreb 
 A Lone Wolf in the 'Maghreb'
 Tony: I will fall in love with Xi'an
 Unveiling the Chanba Sanyo Gun 
 Why did you stop? Check out the selection of retired football players from Espírito Santo 
 Estevão introduces himself and talks about running the Rio Branco defense 

1979 births
Living people
Place of birth missing (living people)
Brazilian footballers
Association football defenders
Estrela do Norte Futebol Clube players
Stade Tunisien players
Beijing Renhe F.C. players
Brazilian expatriate footballers
Expatriate footballers in Tunisia
Brazilian expatriate sportspeople in Tunisia
Expatriate footballers in China
Brazilian expatriate sportspeople in China